Hermes is a subgenus  of sea snails, marine gastropod mollusks in the family Conidae, the cone snails and their allies.

In the new classification of the family Conidae by Puillandre N., Duda T.F., Meyer C., Olivera B.M. & Bouchet P. (2015), Hermes has become a subgenus of Conus: Conus (Hermes) Montfort, 1810 (type species: Conus nussatella Linnaeus, 1758) represented as Conus Thiele, 1929

Distinguishing characteristics
The Tucker & Tenorio 2009 taxonomy distinguishes Hermes from Conus in the following ways:

 Genus Conus sensu stricto Linnaeus, 1758
 Shell characters (living and fossil species)
The basic shell shape is conical to elongated conical, has a deep anal notch on the shoulder, a smooth periostracum and a small operculum. The shoulder of the shell is usually nodulose and the protoconch is usually multispiral. Markings often include the presence of tents except for black or white color variants, with the absence of spiral lines of minute tents and textile bars.
Radular tooth (not known for fossil species) 
The radula has an elongated anterior section with serrations and a large exposed terminating cusp, a non-obvious waist, blade is either small or absent and has a short barb, and lacks a basal spur.
Geographical distribution
These species are found in the Indo-Pacific region.
Feeding habits
These species eat other gastropods including cones.

 Subgenus Hermes Montfort, 1810
Shell characters (living and fossil species)
The shell is elongated and subcylindrical in shape with a tubular body whorl.  The protoconch is multispiral.  The anal notch is shallow.  The shoulders are rounded to subangular.  The shell is ornamented with nodules which die out in the early spire whorls, two or more cords on the whorl tops, and well developed ridges on the body whorl.  The periostracum is smooth, and the operculum is small.
Radular tooth (not known for fossil species)
The anterior section of the radular tooth is shorter than the length of the posterior section, and the blade is long and may cover the full length of the anterior section.  A basal spur is present, the barb is short.  The radular tooth has serrations, and a terminating cusp.
Geographical distribution
The species in this genus occur in the Indo-Pacific region, including Australia.
Feeding habits
The radular tooth suggests that these cone snails are vermivorous, meaning that the cones prey on polychaete worms, however Hermes nussatellus has been reported to feed on mollusks.

Species list
This list of species is based on the information in the World Register of Marine Species (WoRMS) list. Species within the genus Hermes include:
 Hermes nussatella (Linnaeus, 1758): synonym of Conus (Hermes) nussatella Linnaeus, 1758 represented as Conus nussatella Linnaeus, 1758 
The following species have become synonyms of other subgenera of Conus or Conasprella.
 Hermes artoptus (G.B. Sowerby I, 1833): synonym of  Conus artoptus G.B. Sowerby I, 1833
 Hermes austroviola (Röckel & Korn, 1992): synonym of  Conus austroviola Röckel & Korn, 1992
 Hermes kawanishii Shikama, 1970: synonym of Conus nussatella Linnaeus, 1758
 Hermes lizarum Raybaudi Massilia & da Motta, 1992: synonym of Conasprella lizarum (Raybaudi Massilia & da Motta, 1992)
 Hermes terryni (Tenorio & Poppe, 2004): synonym of  Conus terryni Tenorio & Poppe, 2004
 Hermes triggi Cotton, 1945: synonym of Conasprella ximenes (Gray, 1839)
 Hermes viola (Cernohorsky, 1977): synonym of  Conus viola Cernohorsky, 1977
 Hermes violaceus (Gmelin, 1791): synonym of  Conus violaceus Gmelin, 1791

References

Further reading 
 Kohn A. A. (1992). Chronological Taxonomy of Conus, 1758-1840". Smithsonian Institution Press, Washington and London.
 Monteiro A. (ed.) (2007). The Cone Collector 1: 1-28.
 Berschauer D. (2010). Technology and the Fall of the Mono-Generic Family The Cone Collector 15: pp. 51-54
 Puillandre N., Meyer C.P., Bouchet P., and Olivera B.M. (2011), Genetic divergence and geographical variation in the deep-water Conus orbignyi complex (Mollusca: Conoidea)'', Zoologica Scripta 40(4) 350-363.

External links
 To World Register of Marine Species
  Gastropods.com: Conidae setting forth the genera recognized therein.

Conidae
Gastropod subgenera